"Living Proof" is a song written by Johnny MacRae and Steve Clark, and recorded by American country music singer Ricky Van Shelton.  It was released in July 1989 as the fourth single from the album Loving Proof.  It was Shelton's sixth No. 1 single on the Billboard magazine Hot Country Singles chart that October.

Chart positions

Year-end charts

References 

Whitburn, Joel, "Top Country Songs: 1944-2005," 2006.

1989 singles
Ricky Van Shelton songs
Song recordings produced by Steve Buckingham (record producer)
Columbia Nashville Records singles
1988 songs
Songs written by Johnny MacRae